Jim Courier defeated Stefan Edberg in the final, 6–3, 3–6, 6–4, 6–2 to win the men's singles tennis title at the 1992 Australian Open.

Boris Becker was the defending champion, but lost in the third round to John McEnroe.

Future world No. 1 Pat Rafter made his first major appearance.

Seeds

 Stefan Edberg (final)
 Jim Courier (champion)
 Boris Becker (third round)
 Michael Stich (quarterfinals)
 Ivan Lendl (quarterfinals)
 Pete Sampras (withdrew because of a shoulder tendon injury)
 Guy Forget (second round)
 Karel Nováček (second round)

 Petr Korda (first round)
 Goran Ivanišević (second round)
 Magnus Gustafsson (second round)
 Derrick Rostagno (second round)
 Emilio Sánchez (fourth round)
 Michael Chang (third round)
 David Wheaton (fourth round)
 Goran Prpić (second round)

Qualifying

Draw

Finals

Top half

Section 1

Section 2

Section 3

Section 4

Bottom half

Section 5

Section 6

Section 7

Section 8

Notes

a.  Andre Agassi (No. 10) and Sergi Bruguera (No. 11) both withdrew from the tournament prior to the seedings.
b.  No. 2 seed Jim Courier received a walkover into the final after Richard Krajicek withdrew from the tournament because of tendinitis in the shoulder.
c.  Amos Mansdorf advanced to the quarterfinals after Aaron Krickstein retired in the fifth set citing nausea and exhaustion.

References
General

Specific

External links
 1992 Australian Open – Men's draws and results at the International Tennis Federation

Mens singles
Australian Open (tennis) by year – Men's singles